Sónia de Fátima Tavares (born 21 March 1986 in Cebolais de Cima) is a Portuguese athlete who specialises in the sprinting events. She represented her country in the 100 metres at the 2009 World Championships reaching the quarterfinals.

Competition record

Personal bests
Outdoor
100 metres – 11.39 (+2.0 m/s) (Lisbon 2009)
200 metres – 23.43 (+1.3 m/s) (Budapest 2010)
Indoor
60 metres – 7.32 (Mondeville 2012)
200 metres – 25.41 (Espinho 2006)

References

1986 births
Living people
Portuguese female sprinters
Universiade medalists in athletics (track and field)
Portuguese people of Cape Verdean descent
Universiade bronze medalists for Portugal
Competitors at the 2007 Summer Universiade
Competitors at the 2011 Summer Universiade
Competitors at the 2013 Summer Universiade
Medalists at the 2009 Summer Universiade